Peter Pišťanek (28 April 1960, Devínska Nová Ves – 22 March 2015, Bratislava) was a Slovak writer.

His first full-length novel Rivers of Babylon was published in 1991 (in English in 2007 in a translation by Peter Petro). It was followed by two other novels, The Wooden Village and The End of Freddy, which together make up a trilogy. They recount the life of Rácz, a fictitious gangster who emerged in autumn 1989 as communist rule was disintegrating.
Pišťanek was also an active writer about the alcohol beverage industry, providing his insight and humour on both spirits and wines including cognac and bourbon.

On 22 March 2015, Pišťanek committed suicide.

Books
Rivers of Babylon; translated by Peter Petro, Garnett Press 11/2007, 
Wooden Village; translated by Peter Petro, Garnett Press 11/2008,  
End of Freddy; translated by Peter Petro, Garnett Press 11/2009,

See also
 9th ZAI Awards (Special Mention Award)

References

1960 births
2015 suicides
Slovak novelists
Slovak male writers
Male novelists
20th-century novelists
Suicides in Slovakia
Writers from Bratislava
20th-century Slovak writers
20th-century male writers